Qeqertarsuaq may refer to:
 Qeqertarsuaq, town on Disko Island, Greenland

Islands
Qeqertarsuaq or Storø, an island located near Nuuk.
Disko Island, in Greenlandic Qeqertarsuaq, located in Disko Bay.
Qeqertarsuaq, an island in Karrat Fjord near Upernivik Island.
Qeqertarsuaq or Herbert Island, an island located in far northwestern Greenland.
Qeqertarsuaq in SE Greenland
In the Upernavik Archipelago:
Qeqertarsuaq (Upernavik), also known as Qeqertaq
Qeqertarsuaq Island (Upernavik Icefjord)
Qeqertarsuaq Island (Nasaussap Saqqaa)
Qeqertarsuaq Island (Kangerlussuaq Icefjord)